The following trainsets are or were streamliners.

Australia
 XPT (based on the British InterCity 125)

Chile
 Flecha Del Sur AM-100 Series (based on the German Flying Hamburger)

France
SNCF TGV Atlantique
SNCF TGV Duplex
SNCF TGV Iris 320
SNCF TGV La Poste
SNCF TGV POS
SNCF TGV Réseau
SNCF TGV Sud-Est
SNCF TGV Thalys PBKA
TGV 001

Germany
 DRG Class SVT 877 Flying Hamburger
 DRG Class SVT 137
 DB Class VT 11.5 TEE
 ICE 1
 ICE 2
 ICE 3
 ICE 4

Italy
 FS Class ETR 200 original Thirties
 FS Class ETR 240 Polifemo (valentino Nineties special service)
 FS Class ETR 250 Arlecchino 
 FS Class ETR 300 Settebello
 FS Class ETR 500 Rapido
 Frecciarossa 1000

Japan
E1 Series Shinkansen
E2 Series Shinkansen
E3 Series Shinkansen
E4 Series Shinkansen
E5 Series Shinkansen
E6 Series Shinkansen
H5 Series Shinkansen
N700 Series Shinkansen

Korea
KTX-I

Netherlands
Mat' 34
Mat' 35
Mat' 36
omBC
Mat' 40
DE-5
Mat' 46
Plan X Blauwe Engel
Plan Z/ICMm Koploper
V250
ICNG

Philippines
MRR Rail Motor Coaches (post-1929 units)
PNR Japanese Motor Car (JMC) No. 319 Luster, later MC-6366 Nikkō
PNR Airport Express Trains
PNR D8800 class

Poland
 Luxtorpeda “Motor-Express Train”
 Pm36-1

Spain
AVE Class 100
AVE Class 101
AVE Class 102
AVE Class 103

Taiwan
THSR 700T

United Kingdom
Advanced Passenger Train
Blue Pullman
GWR railcars
InterCity 125
InterCity 225
British Rail Class 180
British Rail Class 220 Voyager
British Rail Class 221  Super Voyager
British Rail Class 222
British Rail Class 373
British Rail Class 374
British Rail Class 390 Pendolino
British Rail Class 395 Javelin
British Rail Class 397
British Rail Class 800
British Rail Class 801
British Rail Class 802

United States

21st century trainsets
Amtrak:
Acela Express (trainset)
Avelia Liberty
Siemens Charger and Siemens Venture trainsets
Brightline:
SCB-40 and Siemens Venture trainsets

20th century trainsets

Atchison, Topeka and Santa Fe:
 Aerotrain (GM) (San Diegan)
Boston and Maine / Maine Central
 Flying Yankee (No. 6000)
Chicago, Burlington & Quincy:
 Ak-Sar-Ben Zephyr
 American Royal Zephyr
 General Pershing Zephyr
 Nebraska Zephyr
 Pioneer Zephyr
 Silver Streak Zephyr
 Twin Cities Zephyr
 Zephyr Rocket
Chicago, Rock Island and Pacific
 Aerotrain (GM) (2 trainsets)
 Jet Rocket
 Rocky Mountain Rocket
 Texas Rocket
Gulf, Mobile and Northern
 Rebel
Illinois Central:
 Green Diamond 
 Illinois Central 121
Milwaukee Road
 Hiawatha
 Olympian Hiawatha
Nashville, Chattanooga and St Louis Railway
 City of Memphis
New York Central
 20th Century Limited
 Aerotrain (GM)
 Empire State Express
 Mercury
New York, New Haven and Hartford
 Comet
 Dan'l Webster
 John Quincy Adams
 Roger Williams
Pennsylvania Railroad
 Aerotrain (GM) (The Pennsy)
 The Broadway Limited
 The Jeffersonian
 The South Wind
 The Trail Blazer
Union Pacific:
 Aerotrain (GM) (City of Las Vegas)
 M-10000
 M-10001
 M-10002
 M-10003 through M-10007

References

Streamlined
Trains